Angel of Light or variants thereof may refer to:

 Lucifer, also known as the "Angel of Light"

Music
 Angels of Light, American folk rock band founded by Michael Gira
 The Angels of Light (UK band)
 Angel of Light, a 2019 album by Angel Witch
 "Angel of Light", a song by Dreamtale from the 2011 album Epsilon
 "Angel of Light", a song by Petra from the 1981 album Never Say Die
 "Angel of Light", a song by Mercyful Fate from the 1994 album Time
 Symphony No. 1 (Rautavaara), subtitled Angel of Light, by John Hancock

Other uses
 Angels of Light (theater group), from Liberty, Texas

See also
 Angel of Darkness (disambiguation)